Three services in the New York City Subway are designated as a  S (shuttle) service. These services operate as full-time or almost full-time shuttles. In addition, three services run as shuttles during late night hours but retain their regular service designations.

Shuttle services

Official designations
All of the following services are officially labeled S. The "NYCT designator" column stands for New York City Transit's internal designation for the service.

Late-night shuttles

Former uses 

Other routes have in the past been designated S or SS; the label has also been used for temporary shuttles due to construction. Before June 1979, all shuttles had the label SS; the designation S was reserved for "special"' services, including IND trains to Aqueduct Racetrack. The SS label was first applied in 1967, when all services were labeled due to the completion of the Chrystie Street Connection.

Former uses of the S or SS designation include:
 Bowling Green – South Ferry Shuttle (1909–1977)
 Culver Shuttle (1954–1975)
 Sixth Avenue Shuttle (1986–1988) – ran between 57th Street and Grand Street
 63rd Street Shuttle (1998–1999)
 Grand Street Shuttle (2001–2004)
 Brighton Shuttle (2022) – ran between Prospect Park and Coney Island

Some shuttle routes also used the H or HH designation, which were the last to be assigned to the Independent Subway System. Former uses include the Court Street Shuttle from 1936 to 1946 and Rockaway Park Shuttle until 1993, when that route's label was changed to a blue S. A temporary shuttle that opened in November 2012 after Hurricane Sandy destroyed track connecting the Rockaways to the rest of the system used the H designation.

When the Transit Authority began assigning labels to all services, the Third Avenue Elevated was designated as 8 because it was deemed too long to be considered a "shuttle". However, trains on this line showed SHUTTLE on their rollsigns instead of "8". The service was discontinued in 1973.

Full-time shuttles

Nassau Street Shuttle (1999) 
This shuttle ran only from May to September 1999 during the rehabilitation of the Williamsburg Bridge. The shuttle ran from 6:00 am to 10:00 pm daily from Essex Street to Broad Street (Chambers Street on weekends, late nights, and evenings).

Myrtle Shuttle (2017–2018) 
Two trains operated separately on each of two tracks on the BMT Myrtle Avenue Line between Myrtle-Wyckoff Avenues and Middle Village-Metropolitan Avenue. They ran at all times between September 2, 2017, and April 27, 2018, due to construction on the BMT Myrtle Avenue Line's connector with the BMT Jamaica Line. It was designated as an orange "M" on maps, schedules, and station and service notice signs, and as a brown "M" on the R42 rolling stock, which still had the brown "M" emblems that the route used before 2010.

Part-time shuttles

Lenox Shuttle (mid-1900s – early 1970s) 

The Lenox Terminal Shuttle (also Lenox Shuttle and Lenox Avenue Shuttle) ran between 148th Street and 135th Street when the  did not run. Prior to the opening of the 148th Street station on May 13, 1968, it was called the 145th Street Shuttle, running only to 145th Street, and only from 9:00 pm to 1:00 am. It was in place by 1918, but may have been started in 1905 when the IRT White Plains Road Line opened to the IRT Lenox Avenue Line.

Between 1969 and 1972, it was folded into the 3, but continued to run as a shuttle at those times. Late night 3 service ended on September 10, 1995, due to low ridership, and was not restored until July 27, 2008. During this time, the route was served by a free overnight shuttle bus.

Myrtle Shuttle (1969–1973) 

After the BMT Myrtle Avenue Line south of Broadway ceased operation on October 3, 1969, the MJ service was discontinued and the current nighttime M shuttle was formed, using the lower-level platforms in the same station complex. Prior to 2014, when the M was extended to Essex Street during weekend days, it operated on weekends as well. However, this service was labeled SS and considered a separate route from the M until the two routes merged in 1973.

Bay Ridge Shuttle (1990–2002; 2004–2016) 

On September 30, 1990, late night  trains began operating as a shuttle in Brooklyn, between 36th Street (cut back from 57th Street in Manhattan) and 95th Street. In 1999, northbound trains began skipping 53rd Street and 45th Streets to avoid discharging passengers on tracks used by through trains. From September 8, 2002, until February 22, 2004, this service was extended northward to Pacific Street, due to reconstruction of the
Coney Island station, running express north of 36th Street. On November 5, 2016, late night R trains were extended to Whitehall Street in Lower Manhattan.

Notes and references

Notes

References

External links 

nycsubway.org
New York City Subway Historical Maps
FAQ: The Letter, Number and Color Codes of the New York Subways
Line By Line History

New York City Subway services
Defunct New York City Subway services